Turgeon Lake is a freshwater body located in the Northwest province of Quebec, in Canada. This body of water straddles the municipalities of:
Eeyou Istchee Baie-James (municipality) (township of Lavergne), in Jamésie, in the administrative region of Nord-du-Québec;
Chazel, Quebec (township of Chazel) in the Regional County Municipality (RCM) of Abitibi-Ouest, in the administrative region of Abitibi-Témiscamingue.

The demarcation line of the two administrative regions of Quebec passes in the middle of southeastern part of Lake Turgeon.

Forestry is the main economic activity of the sector; recreational tourism activities, second.

This hydrographic slope is served on the west side by the Conquerors road (North-South direction) and a forest road "Chemin de la presqu’île" (East-West direction) serving a peninsula of the South shore. The resort has developed on the southern shore of the bay between the mouth of the Lavergne River and the peninsula advancing to the North.

Annually, the lake surface is generally frozen from mid-November to late April, however, the period of safe ice circulation is usually from mid-December to mid-April.

Geography

Toponymy 
In the past, this lake was designated "Nigigwadinibi Lake" by the Native Americans of the Algonquin Nation, meaning "lake with cold crystallized waters". The names of the bays and islands are all of Algonquin origin.

The toponym "Lac Turgeon" was made official on December 5, 1968 by the Commission de toponymie du Québec, when it was created.

Notes and references

See also 

Lakes of Abitibi-Témiscamingue
Lakes of Nord-du-Québec